Inside the  Head of John Peel is a Man or Astro-man? double 7-inch EP released on Astro-Fonic Records in 1997. It was recorded during a Peel Session on March 19, 1995, although the record states March 20, 1995. This is a bootleg release but it is not a bootleg recording of Man or Astro-man?. It came with a jukebox label insert.

Track listing 
A. Sferic Waves
B. ----- (Classified)
C. Inside the Head of John Peel
D. Max Q

Contributors
Bird Stuff - drums
Coco The Electronic Monkey Wizard - bass
Star Crunch - lead guitar, vocals
Captain Zeno - rhythm guitar, vocals

References

1997 EPs
Man or Astro-man? albums
Peel Sessions recordings
Bootleg recordings
Live EPs
1997 live albums